Dame Rosemary Janet Mair Butler  (née McGrath; born 21 January 1943) is a British politician who served as the Llywydd of the Senedd from 2011 to 2016. A member of Welsh Labour, Butler was the  Member of the Senedd (AM) for Newport West from 1999 to 2016.

Serving briefly as Secretary for Education in the first two years of the Welsh Government, she was elected Dirprwy Lywydd of the Senedd in May 2007. In May 2011, Butler was elected as the Llywydd of the Senedd. She did not stand for election to the Senedd in the 2016 elections.

Family

Rosemary Janet Mair McGrath was born in Much Wenlock, Shropshire. Her family moved to the Rhymney Valley soon after. As a teenager she moved to Newport with her parents (Godfrey and Gwen McGrath) and brother John; there she attended St Julian's High School.

In the early 1960s she met her husband Derek Butler, whom she married in 1966. He was a lecturer in art and design at Newport Art college, which was at the time based in Clarence Place. They have two daughters, Kate (born 1968-2013) and Alice (born 1970)

Local politics
In 1971 Butler joined the Labour Party. She was elected to Newport Borough Council from Caerleon ward in 1973, and played an important part in Labour administrations on the council as Deputy Leader and Mayor of Newport in 1989–90. She was Chair of the Leisure Services Committee for 12 years.

National Assembly
At the first Senedd election in 1999, Butler was selected as Labour candidate for Newport West which she won. She was appointed Secretary for Education: Minister for Children and Young People (up to 16) by Alun Michael but held office only for a year, leaving in October 2000 when the new First Minister, Rhodri Morgan, formed a coalition government. She was Chair of the Senedd's Culture, Welsh Language and Sport Committee and served on the Panel of Chairs. She led the British Council activities in the Senedd and also represents the Senedd on the European Committee of the Regions (CoR) where she is a member of the Bureau (executive) of the Committee.

Presiding Officer and Deputy Presiding Officer

On 9 May 2007, Butler was picked as the Labour group's nominee for Dirprwy Llywydd of the Senedd, a position vacant by the defeat of the previous holder and which had to be held by a member from a different party to the Llywydd. Her election by the whole of the Senedd was not opposed. Butler was appointed the second Llywydd of the Senedd on 11 May 2011, following Dafydd Elis-Thomas.

Butler was appointed Dame Commander of the Order of the British Empire (DBE) in the 2014 New Year Honours for political and public services, particularly to women.

Women in Public Life Campaign #POWiPL
In 2012 Rosemary Butler AM launched a campaign to address the need for more women to apply for and take up public roles and appointments. Her Women in Public Life campaign (POWiPL) aims to ensure that women are fairly represented at all levels of public life in Wales.

During the campaign, Rosemary has hosted many high-profile influential speakers at the Senedd, most notably former Prime Minister of Australia, Julia Gillard to talk about gender equality and encourage women to put themselves forward for public appointments. She also launched a website; Women in Public Life Portal to enable women in Wales to search for public appointments.

In October 2014, Rosemary launched a mentoring and development scheme for women who wanted to gain experience in public life and undergo training to help prepare them for decision making roles over a period of 18 months. The scheme is delivered by Chwarae Teg and Cardiff Business School on behalf of the Senedd.

Personal interests
 Honorary Fellow of the University of Wales, Newport 
 Co-founder and Chair of the Newport International Competition for Young Pianists
 An Honorary Citizen of Newport's twin town Kutaisi (Republic of Georgia), and founding member of the Newport-Kutaisi Twinning Association
 President of the Friends of Newport Transporter Bridge
 President of the Wales Home Safety Council
 President of Newport Harriers Athletic Club
 Honorary Life Member of Newport Sports Council
 Life Member of Newport Cricket Club
 Founder member of the Friends of Tredegar House
 Ambassador for Girl Guiding
 Founder member of Newport Women's Aid
 Member of Women's International League of Peace and Freedom
 Patron of Caerleon Arts Festival 
 Chairwoman, Newport Women's Forum
 Chairwoman, Live Music Now Wales

Footnotes

References
 BBC profile
 Personal website
 Carwyn Jones reappointed as Wales' first minister

External links

Offices held

1943 births
People from Much Wenlock
Councillors in Wales
Wales AMs 1999–2003
Wales AMs 2003–2007
Wales AMs 2007–2011
Wales AMs 2011–2016
Politics of Newport, Wales
Female members of the Senedd
Welsh people of Irish descent
Welsh Labour members of the Senedd
Living people
People from Bargoed
Presiding Officers of the Senedd
20th-century British women politicians
Women councillors in Wales